Abū Isḥāq Ibrāhīm ibn Mūsā al-Shāṭibī (720 – 790 A.H./1320 – 1388 C.E.) was an Andalusí Sunni Islamic legal scholar following the Maliki madhab. He died in 1388 in Granada.
Imam Shatibi's full name was "Ibrahim bin Mosa bin Muhammad al-Shatibi al-Gharnati". His family descended from the Banu Lakhm. His kunya was "Abu Ishaq", and his surnames were "Al-Lakhmi", "Al-Gharnati", "Al-Maliki" and "As-Shatibi".
The date and place of his birth are unknown. However, one of his surnames, "As-Shatibi", points to the city Xàtiva, which indicates that he was a descendant of migrants from that town.

Books 
He learned from very prominent scholars of his time. He became a master in Arabic language and ittihad and research at a very early age. He would discuss various topics with his teachers before arriving to any conclusion.
Al-Iʻtiṣām (كتاب الاعتصام),  - This famous book of Imam Shatibi is the ultimate encyclopedia on the topic of defining religious innovations. It consists of 10 chapters. The introduction is written by Syed Rasheed Radha Al-Misri. This mammoth book was published by Dar al-Kutb Al-Arabiya in 1931 in Cairo.
Al-Muwafaqaat fi Usool al-Sharia (الموافقات في اصول الشريعة),  - This is also one of Imam Shatibi's best known books. It is on the topic of Usul al-fiqh, and Islamic jurisprudence and Maqasid Al-Sharia (higher objectives). It was published by Dawlat Al-Tunisia (Tunisia) in four volumes (translated and published into English as The Reconciliation of the Fundamentals of Islamic Law).
Shara ala al-Khutasa - This book is about Ilm al-Nahw.
Al-Itifaq fi Elm al-Ishtiqaq - This book was on the topic of Ilm al-Sarf, or Arabic morphology, but it was lost during his life.
Kitab al-Majalis - This book included commentary on Sahih Bukhari book al-Kitab Al-Biyooh.
Kitab Al-ifidaat wa Al-inshadaat - This book included two volumes on Literature.

References

 Muhammad Khalid Masud, Islamic Legal Philosophy: A Study of Abu Ishaq al-Shatibi's Life and Thought, McGill University 1977
Dr. Ahmad Raysuni, Imam Shatibi's Theory of the Higher Objectives and Intents of Islamic Law translated by Nancy Roberts, publisher IIIT.
 Wael B. Hallaq, A History of Islamic Legal Theories, Cambridge 1997, Ch. 5.
 The Shatibi Center, The Life of Al-Imam Ash-Shatibi, shatibionline.com

14th-century Muslim scholars of Islam
Maliki scholars from al-Andalus
Writers from al-Andalus
Mujaddid
1388 deaths
14th-century jurists
Scholars of the Nasrid period
14th-century Arabs
Asharis